El Hilal Sports Club El Obeid or simply El Hilal El Obeid is a Sudanese sports club established in 1931 based in El-Obeid. It is active in the Sudan Premier League and participated for the first time in the 2017 CAF Confederation Cup.

Honours

National titles
Sudan Cup
Runners-up (2): 2016, 2018

Performance CAF competitions
CAF Confederation Cup:4 appearances
2017 – Quarter-finals
2018 - play-off round
2018-19  - First round
2020-21 - First round

Performance CECAFA competitions
CECAFA Clubs Cup: 1 appearance
1984 – Group stage

Current squad (2020-21)

See also 
 Al-Hilal Club (Omdurman)
 Al-Hilal SC (Kadougli)
 Al-Hilal ESC (Al-Fasher)

References

External links 
 Official website

Football clubs in Sudan
El-Obeid